Dentitegumia is a monotypic snout moth genus described by Hans Georg Amsel in 1961. Its only species,  Dentitegumia nigrigranella, described by Émile Louis Ragonot in 1890, is found in Israel.

References

Phycitinae
Monotypic moth genera
Moths of the Middle East